John Pedewell of Wells, Somerset, was an English politician.

Family
Pedewell was probably the son of William Pedewell of Wells, Somerset. John Pedewell married a woman named Agnes. They had two sons, whose names are unrecorded.

Career
He was a Member (MP) of the Parliament of England for Wells in December 1421 and 1426.

References

Year of birth missing
Year of death missing
English MPs December 1421
People from Wells, Somerset
English MPs 1426